The Ruth and Elmer Wellin Museum of Art is a teaching museum on the campus of Hamilton College in Clinton, New York. The Wellin invites visitors to discover the arts and form unexpected connections through groundbreaking exhibitions, a globally representative teaching collection, and engaging programming.

The Wellin Museum opened in 2012 with Tracy L. Adler as its founding Director. Its 30,537-square-foot building was designed by Machado Silvetti. Architecturally, the building turns the concept of a museum inside out, revealing the inner workings of the institution and its collection for all to see. Art storage, conservation workshops, administrative offices, and teaching spaces are visible to museum visitors.

As an academic museum, the Wellin presents exhibitions that complement Hamilton College's interdisciplinary and liberal arts curriculum. Hamilton students engage with the museum through a variety of programs and work opportunities as docents and student assistants in areas such as education, exhibitions, digital marketing, events, and special projects including collection cataloguing and research. Faculty members incorporate the collection and exhibitions into their curriculum in partnership with museum staff. The Wellin is also proud to serve as a resource for the broader community, offering artist lectures, customized tours, educator workshops, student-led gatherings, school trips, and creative events for children and families.

Collection
The Wellin Museum of Art's collection includes over 7,000 objects representing a broad range of cultures, historical periods, artistic practices and movements, including Greek and Roman antiquities, Native American art and artifacts, drawings and watercolors from the Beinecke Collection of the Lesser Antilles, and American, European, and Asian artworks in all mediums. Echoing the interdisciplinary nature of Hamilton's liberal arts education, the Wellin continues to grow and develop a globally representative collection with an emphasis on works that strengthen its existing holdings, and support the academic mission of the college. Browse the collection on the Wellin's website: Hamilton.edu/wellin.

Exhibitions
The Wellin Museum of Art presents several rotating exhibitions annually, including group shows and surveys dedicated to a single artist. While the Wellin presents work by artists at various stages in their careers, there is an emphasis on emerging and mid-career artists, supporting the growth and expansion of their artistic practice to develop new work to debut at the Wellin. The museum partners with artists to foster and realize original projects, often in collaboration with Hamilton College students. Featuring an international roster of exhibiting artists exploring an array of themes, the Wellin often provides the first opportunity for artists to mount solo shows dedicated to their work. Through the Wellin's outreach efforts, the Hamilton community has the opportunity to engage with the artists through class visits, public events, and studio critiques, among other programs. For example, Elias Sime: Tightrope debuted at the Wellin Museum of Art from September 7 through December 8, 2019, and traveled to the Akron Art Museum in Akron, Ohio (February 29–May 24, 2020), the Kemper Museum of Contemporary Art in Kansas City, Missouri (August 11–January 31, 2021), and the Royal Ontario Museum in Toronto, Canada (July 16–September 5, 2021);  Jeffrey Gibson: This Is the Day debuted at the Wellin Museum of Art from September 8 through December 9, 2018 and traveled to the Blanton Museum of Art at the University of Texas at Austin (July 14–September 29, 2019); Julia Jacquette: Unrequited and Acts of Play debuted at the Wellin Museum of Art from February 18 through July 2, 2017, and traveled to the Visual Arts Center of New Jersey (September 24, 2017 – January 14, 2018).

Publications
The museum has developed a robust publications program for its exhibitions introducing new scholarship to the field through essay contributions by world-renowned curators, critics, and scholars. These high-quality publications contribute to a broader dialogue about the exhibitions through documentation and critical writing. The Wellin collaborates with publishers to distribute books internationally, thus expanding the range of the museum's scholarly efforts. The museum has copublished books with DelMonico Books/Prestel and D.A.P. Select publications include monographic catalogues to accompany exhibitions for Alyson Shotz: Force of Nature, Yun-Fei Ji: The Intimate Universe, Julia Jacquette: Unrequited and Acts of Play, Jeffrey Gibson: This Is the Day, Elias Sime: Tightrope, Michael Rakowitz: Nimrud, and Sarah Oppenheimer: Sensitive Machine.

Naming
The Wellin Museum is named in memory of Ruth and Elmer Wellin, parents of Keith Wellin, Hamilton class of 1950, who, with his wife Wendy, provided leadership funding for the museum. The Exhibition Gallery was named in honor of Daniel W. Dietrich ’64. Tracy L. Adler is the Johnson-Pote Director of the Wellin Museum.

For more information about the Wellin Museum of Art, visit https://www.hamilton.edu/wellin and follow along on Facebook, Twitter, and Instagram.

References

External links

 Ruth and Elmer Wellin Museum of Art
 https://www.hamilton.edu/wellin/publications

University art museums and galleries in New York (state)
Museums in Oneida County, New York
Hamilton College (New York)
Art museums and galleries in New York (state)
University museums in New York (state)
Art museums established in 2012
2012 establishments in New York (state)
Clinton (village), New York